The 2006 Bound for Glory was a professional wrestling pay-per-view (PPV) event produced by Total Nonstop Action Wrestling, which took place on October 22, 2006 from the Compuware Sports Arena in the Detroit suburb of Plymouth Township, Michigan. It was the second event under the Bound for Glory chronology. Eight professional wrestling matches were featured on the event's card, with Jeff Jarrett defending his NWA World Heavyweight Championship against Sting with the stipulation that Sting would retire from professional wrestling if he'd lose. 

Bound for Glory was the first TNA pay-per-view event held in a location other than Nashville, Tennessee, or Orlando, Florida, since the first two weekly pay-per-views in June 2002, which were held in Huntsville, Alabama. The Compuware Sports Arena was also the site of the first TNA house show. This was the first pay-per-view to feature a half-hour "Road to" preview airing the night before. This continued for future pay-per-views. This was the first and only time that all of TNA's active championships at the time changed hands in one night.

In October 2017, with the launch of the Global Wrestling Network, the event became available to stream on demand.

Results

Gauntlet Battle Royal entrances and eliminations

1.  Johnson was not an official entrant.

References

External links
TNAWrestling.com - the official website of Total Nonstop Action Wrestling

Bound for Glory (wrestling pay-per-view)
Professional wrestling in Michigan
2006 in Detroit
Sports in Plymouth Township, Michigan
October 2006 events in the United States
2006 Total Nonstop Action Wrestling pay-per-view events